The Mackerel Islets are two small islands in south-eastern Australia.  They are part of the Tasman Island Group, lying close to the south-eastern coast of Tasmania around the Tasman Peninsula.

Flora and fauna
The larger eastern islet contains stands of blackwood, surrounded by introduced grasses and pigface.  The western islet is a flat, rocky reef, without vegetation, that is used as a roost site by black-faced cormorants.

References

Notes

Sources
 Brothers, Nigel; Pemberton, David; Pryor, Helen; & Halley, Vanessa. (2001). Tasmania’s Offshore Islands: seabirds and other natural features. Tasmanian Museum and Art Gallery: Hobart. 

Islands of Tasmania